Barbie as the Island Princess is a 2007 computer-animated musical film. It was released to DVD on September 18, 2007, and made its television premiere on Nickelodeon on September 23, 2007.

The film is part of the Barbie film series and the second to be a musical. The film features the voice of Kelly Sheridan as Ro and is the only Barbie film to be animated by Mainframe Studios as Rainmaker Animation.

The score for this film was composed by Arnie Roth. Songs for the film were written by Megan Cavallari, Amy Powers and executive producer Rob Hudnut.

Plot
 
Sagi the red panda and Azul the Indian peacock live on a tropical island in the South Seas. They discover a little girl and a chest of belongings washed up after a storm, and take her in and name her "Ro", the only two letters left on her chests' broken nameplate. Ten years later, Ro (played by Barbie) has learned to speak to animals and grows up to be a beautiful young woman, spending her days playing on the island with Azul, Sagi, and an elephant named Tika.

Prince Antonio (played by Ken) is out exploring the South Seas, and finds himself on Ro's Island. She saves him from a float of crocodiles, and Antonio invites her to return with him to his Kingdom of Apollonia, so she can search for clues as to her forgotten past. Ro agrees, bringing her three friends with her. On the journey, Ro and Antonio begin to fall in love.

In Apollonia, King Peter and Queen Danielle are shocked when they meet Ro. Peter had arranged a marriage for Antonio while he was away to force his son to settle down and stop adventuring. He takes an immediate dislike to the "Wild Island Girl" for disrupting his plans. However, Antonio's three little sisters, Rita (played by Chelsie), Sofia (played by Kelly), Gina (played by Becky), and Danielle's pet rhesus monkey Tallulah, immediately befriend Ro and her animals.

Antonio's betrothed, Princess Luciana, and her mother Queen Ariana arrive, so Antonio can meet them. Unbeknownst to everyone, even Luciana, Ariana's parents committed treason and were demoted to swineherds by Peter, long ago. Ariana married an elderly king to become queen and now is seeking a way to enact revenge on Peter; seeing Ro as a threat, she works to sabotage all Ro's attempts to fit in. However, Antonio falls more and more in love with Ro, and Luciana herself, being kindhearted, feels sorry for her.

Ro, demoralized by her 'failures', thinks about returning to the island. Tallulah, Sagi, Azul and Tika cheer her up and help her get dressed up for a royal ball. At the ball, everyone is impressed by Ro's beauty and grace, and Antonio privately proposes to her. However, Ro refuses, reminding Antonio his duty is to obey his father.

Antonio argues with Peter and eventually abdicates the crown to one of his younger sisters. He leaves a note for Ro to say he will run away with her. Tika, afraid to lose Ro, overhears and hides the note. Meanwhile, Ariana sends her pet rats to spread "sunset herb" through the kingdom. The poison causes all animals who ingest it to fall into a coma, including Tallulah and Azul. King Peter, concluding Ro and her animals brought the "disease", imprisons them.

Peter strikes a bargain with Antonio – he will free Ro if Antonio marries Luciana. Ro and her animals are sent off on a ship, and Tika, realizing her mistake, confesses to Ro about the note and is forgiven. A sailor, bribed by Ariana, knocks them all overboard. In the water, Ro remembers the shipwreck of her childhood, and that her real name is Rosella.

Returning to the Kingdom with the help of some dolphins, Ro learns from a little bird that Ariana put sunset herb in the wedding cake to kill Peter and Antonio. Ro makes an antidote to wake Azul and the other animals, but is stopped by guards. Tika disrupts the wedding and gets Antonio to come to Ro's rescue, while Sagi takes the antidote to Tallulah, waking her. When Ro accuses Ariana, no one believes her, until Luciana, remembering her mother forbade her to eat anything after the wedding, defends Ro. Ariana flees in a carriage, but is wrecked and flung into a pigsty.

When Ro reveals to Antonio she has remembered her full name, a wedding guest, Queen Marissa of Paladia, comes forward, saying she lost her daughter Rosella at sea many years ago. Ro and Marissa sing a lullaby from Ro's childhood together, confirming the truth of the story. Peter begs Ro's forgiveness and thanks her for saving their lives, and she and Antonio are married, while Luciana meets a handsome prince at the wedding. Ro and Antonio then sail off to find new adventures, with Tika, Sagi, Azul, and Tallulah in tow.

Voice cast
Cast as per the closing credits:
Kelly Sheridan as "Ro"/Princess Rosella of Paladia (played by Barbie). As a little girl, she falls overboard during a storm while on a ship in the South Seas. She washes up on an island and suffers amnesia afterwards, setting up the events of the film.
Melissa Lyons as Singing Voice of Ro
Alessandro Juliani as Prince Antonio of Appolonia (played by Ken), Luciana's betrothed. He prefers adventure and intrigue over mundane palace life, and falls for Ro.
Christopher Gaze as Sagi, a wise and kindly red panda who takes Ro in after the wreck and acts as a father figure.
Steve Marvel as Azul, a flamboyant and self-important Indian peacock. Initially, he is opposed to the idea of raising Ro, but he becomes a close friend to her later.
Susan Roman as Tika, a sweet elephant who looks up to Ro as an older sister or mother, and is very jealous of Antonio.
Garry Chalk as Frazer, Antonio's traveling companion/friend/manservant. Chalk also voiced a minor character named Calvin.
Russell Roberts as King Peter, Antonio's father, who disapproves of his son's adventuring. He arranges a marriage between Antonio and Luciana, and dislikes Ro. 
Patricia Drake as Queen Danielle, Antonio's mother and the doting owner of Tallulah. She is unsure what to think about Ro's strange behaviors. Drake also voices the Mama Pig.
 Bets Malone as Tallulah, a friendly but somewhat spoiled rhesus monkey who was orphaned on a South Seas island, and discovered and brought back as a pet for Antonio's mother. 
Britt McKillip as Rita (played by Chelsie), Antonio's little sister. She and her siblings instantly like Ro and her animals, especially Tika, whom they dress up.
Carly McKillip as Gina (played by Becky), Antonio's other little sister.
Chantal Strand as Sofia (played by Kelly), Antonio's other little sister.
Andrea Martin as Queen Ariana. When she was a young adult, her parents were demoted by King Peter for treason. She married an elderly king who died shortly after, and had Luciana after hearing about Peter's son. She plans to use her position to kill Peter and take over Appolonia. 
Candice Nicole as Princess Luciana, Arianna's kindhearted and friendly daughter, and Antonio's betrothed. She is initially under her mother's thumb but eventually stands up to her.
Kate Fisher as Queen Marissa of Paladia, Ro's long-lost mother.
Brian Drummond as Lorenzo, the vet
Terry Klassen as Butler, Guard, Horse
 David Kaye as Guard
Kathleen Barr as Tiny, a little bluebird.
Scott Page-Pagter as Nat, one of Ariana's pet rats.
Ian James Corlett as Pat, one of Ariana's pet rats.

As a gag credit, Matt, the mime rat, is credited to be voiced by himself.

Songs
The songs in the film are written by Megan Cavallari and Amy Powers with executive producer Rob Hudnut. In chronological order, they are:

"Here on My Island" – Melissa Lyons, Steve Marvel, Christopher Gaze and Susan Roman
"Right Here in My Arms" – Melissa Lyons
"A Brand New Shore" – Alessandro Juliani, Susan Roman, Christopher Gaze, Steve Marvel and Melissa Lyons
"I Need to Know" – Melissa Lyons and Alessandro Juliani
"Love is for Peasants" – Andrea Martin and Candice Nicole
"Right Here in My Arms" (Greenhouse) – Melissa Lyons
"At the Ball" – Bets Malone, Christopher Glaze, Melissa Lyons, Susan Roman and Steve Marvel
"The Rat Song" – Andrea Martin, Scott Page-Pagter and Ian James Corlett
"Always More" – Melissa Lyons 
"Right Here in My Arms" (Reunion) – Melissa Lyons and Kate Fisher
"When We Have Love" – Candice Nicole, Kate Fisher, Betsy Malone, Steve Marvel, Susan Roman, Christopher Gaze, Melissa Lyons and Alessandro Juliani
"I Need to Know" (Pop Version) – Cassidy Ladden

Reception
Paul Mavis of DVD Talk wrote, Barbie as The Island Princess is a well-executed CGI animated fantasy with a sweet, tender, believable approach to its love story that will no doubt make little girls sigh with delight." Catherine Dawson March of The Globe and Mail called the film "enchanting" and considered its songs to be "on par with Barbie as the Princess and the Pauper".

Common Sense Media's Nancy Davis Kho wrote of the film, "parents can rest assured that the subject matter is entertaining and kid-appropriate, and put their energies toward worrying about all the commercialism surrounding it." Kho praised the animation and "lush original score", and wrote that Ro and Luciana are positive role models.

Video game

Barbie as the Island Princess is a 2007 platform video game based on the movie for PlayStation 2, Microsoft Windows, Wii, Nintendo DS, and Game Boy Advance. Developed by Human Soft and published by Activision, it is a collection of 28 different mini-games.

References

External links
Official Website

2007 films
2007 direct-to-video films
Island Princess
2007 computer-animated films
2000s English-language films
Universal Pictures direct-to-video animated films
Universal Pictures direct-to-video films
2000s musical fantasy films
Fictional princesses
Fictional princes
Fictional kings
Fictional queens
2000s American animated films
American children's animated fantasy films
American direct-to-video films
American children's animated musical films
Canadian children's fantasy films
Canadian animated fantasy films
Canadian independent films
Films set in Italy
Films set on fictional islands
Films about orphans
Films about animals
2000s children's animated films
2000s children's fantasy films
Canadian direct-to-video films
Video games developed in Lithuania
Video games developed in the United States
Video games set in Italy
2000s Canadian films